Andri Stafa (born 14 February 2002) is an Albanian footballer who plays as a midfielder for Football Superleague of Kosovo club Llapi.

Career

KF Tirana
A graduate of the club's youth academy, Stafa signed his first professional contract in January 2020, penning a three-year deal with the club. In June 2020, he made his league debut, coming on as a 70th-minute substitute for Jurgen Çelhaka in a 5–0 away victory over Luftëtari. However, this wasn't his first competitive appearance for the club. On 25 September 2018, Stafa tallied 32 minutes off the bench in a 4–0 victory over KF Iliria during Albanian Cup play, successfully making his debut for the club in an official competition.

References

Honours
Tirana
 Albanian Superliga: 2019–20

External links
Andri Stafa at Sofa Score

2002 births
Living people
KF Tirana players
Kategoria Superiore players
Albanian footballers
Albania youth international footballers
Association football midfielders